The 42nd FIE Fencing World Cup began in October 2012 and concluded in July 2013 at the 2013 World Fencing Championships held in Budapest. Andrea Cassarà of Italy won the title for a record fifth time in men's foil, while Romania's Ana Maria Brânză ended up the top-ranked fencer in women's épée for a record third time. The World Cup medals were awarded during the FIE's gala dinner in Paris at the Automobile Club de France on 30 November 2013.

Individual Épée

Top 10

Men's épée

Women's épée

Individual Foil

Top 10

Men's foil

Women's foil

Individual Sabre

Top 10

Men's sabre

Women's sabre

Team Épée

Top 10

Men's team épée

Women's team épée

Team Foil

Top 10

Men's team foil

Women's team foil

Team Sabre

Top 10

Men's team sabre

Women's team sabre

References 

Fencing World Cup
2012 in fencing
2013 in fencing
International fencing competitions hosted by Hungary
2016 in Hungarian sport